Seachd: The Inaccessible Pinnacle is a 2007 Scottish Gaelic-language British film by first-time director, Simon Miller from a story by Simon Miller and Joanne Cockwell. It stars Patrick Morrison/Pàdruig Moireasdan and the Gaelic writer and poet Angus Peter Campbell/Aonghas Pàdraig Chaimbeul. It is the first contemporary feature-length film in Scottish Gaelic and was based on a previous Gaelic short film, Foighidinn - The Crimson Snowdrop, also by Miller.

Filming began in April 2006 around the Inaccessible Pinnacle at the top of Sgurr Dearg in the Cuillin mountains on the Isle of Skye in Scotland, and was completed in August 2006. The film screened at the Celtic Media Festival in March 2007, and made its world premiere at the 61st Edinburgh International Film Festival in August 2007.

The word  in the title means "seven" and references the number of stories the grandfather originally told.

Plot 
When a young man, Angus, visits his dying grandfather in hospital he cannot hold back his boyhood quest for the truth - the truth behind the death of his parents and the truth behind his grandfather's ancient, incredible, fearful stories. Stories from the whole swathe of Gàidhealtachd history of poisoned lovers, bloody revenge, water-horses and Spanish gold. His grandfather hijacks Angus' life, for one last time leading him to one of Scotland's most treacherous mountains, the Inaccessible Pinnacle on the Isle of Skye, and an ancient truth he never expected to find.

BAFTA controversy 
In the autumn of 2007, BAFTA refused to put the film, along with the Welsh-language film Calon Gaeth, forward as candidates for the Best Foreign Language Film Category at the 2008 Academy Awards. Christopher Young, the film's producer, claimed that the decision was "anti-Gaelic" and resigned his membership of BAFTA. The issue was raised in the Scottish Parliament.

Production 
The film received funding from the Gaelic Media Service, BBC Alba, the Glasgow Film Office and Scottish Screen. It had a budget of £655,000 ($1.3m) and was shot on Skye in 2006.

Reception 

The film was nominated for 3 BAFTAs and Miller for the Michael Powell Award and was warmly received with comparisons drawn to works such as Big Fish and The Princess Bride.

Cast 
Angus Peter Campbell/Aonghas Pàdraig Caimbeul as Grandfather
Patrick Morrison/Pàdruig Moireasdan as Aonghas (aged 9)
Coll Macdonald/Colla Dòmhnallach as Aonghas (aged 20)
Dolina MacLennan as Grandmother
David Walker/Daibhidh Walker as Archie
Winnie Brook Young as Màiri
Chris Macdonald/Crìsdean Dòmhnallach as Donnchadh
Annie Macleod/Annie NicLeòid as Akira Gunn
Calum MacFhionghain as The Magician
Scott Handy as Patrick Loch
Toby Robertson as The Duke of Sutherland
Màrtainn Mac an t-Saoir as Akira's father
Iain Macrae as Macdonald/An Dòmhnallach
Vidal Sancho as The Spaniard
Isabel NicRath as Sìleas
Meg Bateman as Sìleas' mother
Charles Quinnell/Tearlach Quinnell as Each Uisge/Water-horse
Kathleen MacInnes/Kathleen NicAonghais as Catriona
Eòghainn MacFhionghain as Calum
Angus Macdonald/Aonghas MacDhòmhnaill as The Eldest Son/Am Mac Bu Shine
Kathleen Macdonald/Kathleen NicDhòmhnaill as Ailsa Macleod/Eilis NicLeòid
Iain "Seonachan" MacLeòid as Alec
Aonghas Iain MacDhòmhnaill as Eòghainn
Lachlan Graham as Neach-Leanmhainn
Niall Caimbeul as Geàrrd/Neach-ciùil
Coinneach MacEalair Saighdear
Jim Sutherland as Neach-ciùil
Marian Lloyd as Neach-ciùil
Iseabail Strachan as Neach-ciùil
Fiona NicAsgaill as Neach-ciùil

References

External links 

 

2007 films
Scottish Gaelic-language films
Scottish drama films
2007 directorial debut films
2000s British films